= Ephraim Usman =

Nigerian politician

- Citizenship: Nigerian
- Occupation: politician
- Political party: Peoples Democratic Party

Ephraim Usman (born 11 February 1978) is a Nigerian politician and a member of People's Democratic Party who serves as a commissioner of local government and chieftaincy affairs in Plateau State, and is also the founder of Ephraim Boys FC Dengi.
